Seabourn Cruise Line is a cruise line headquartered in Seattle, Washington. It is owned by Carnival Corporation & plc.

History 

Seabourn Cruise Line was founded in 1986 under the name "Signet Cruise Lines" by the Norwegian private investor  and Warren S. Titus. The name "Seabourn Cruise Line" was adopted shortly afterward following objections over trademark ownership by Signet Oil.

Its first ship, Seabourn Pride, entered service in 1988, followed by an identical sister, Seabourn Spirit, in 1989. A third vessel, originally planned for 1990, was delayed due to investors' financial constraints and was ultimately purchased by Royal Viking Line in 1992 as Royal Viking Queen. In 1995, Royal Viking Queen was transferred to a Kloster subsidiary, Royal Cruise Line, as Queen Odyssey. 

In 1991, Carnival Corporation purchased a 25% stake in Seabourn. Carnival Corporation increased its stake to 50% in 1996, providing the company sufficient capital to purchase the Queen Odyssey, which was then renamed Seabourn Legend. 

In 1998, in partnership with a consortium of a Norwegian businessmen, Carnival purchased the remaining 50% stake in Seabourn, as well as acquiring the Cunard Line from Kvaerner ASA, and merged the two brands into an entity called Cunard Line. In 1999, three Cunard ships, Sea Goddess I, Sea Goddess II, and Royal Viking Sun were transferred into the Seabourn fleet as Seabourn Goddess I, Seabourn Goddess II, and Seabourn Sun.

In 2001, Carnival bought out the Norwegian shareholders, and Seabourn's parent company became a wholly owned subsidiary of Carnival. That summer, Seabourn Goddess I and Seabourn Goddess II were sold to Seabourn's original founder, Atle Brynestad, in order to establish his own cruise line SeaDream Yacht Club. In 2002, Seabourn Sun was transferred to the Carnival-owned Holland America Line, reducing the Seabourn fleet to its three original sister ships, and the company was demerged from Cunard Line and reorganized as a stand-alone operating brand of Carnival Corporation & plc.

In October 2006, Seabourn ordered three new, 32,000-ton cruise ships from Genoa's T. Mariotti shipyard. The first, named Seabourn Odyssey entered service in 2009, followed by the Seabourn Sojourn in 2010 and the Seabourn Quest in June 2011.  The three ships share most features. The Odyssey, Sojourn, and Quest have a maximum passenger capacity of 450 guests, quartered in 225 suite cabins, 90% of which have a balcony. The  vessels cost approximately US$250 million each. The ships have 11 decks, an  indoor/outdoor spa, and four alternative dining venues.

On March 31, 2011, Seabourn moved operations from Miami, Florida, to the Holland America Line quarters in Seattle, Washington.

It was announced on February 19, 2013, that Seabourn reached an agreement with Windstar Cruises for the sale of the three smaller Seabourn ships. Seabourn Pride  departed the fleet in April 2014, sisters Seabourn Legend & Seabourn Spirit departed in April and May 2015, respectively. No cruises were cancelled as the ships sailed with Seabourn until their initial dry dock periods.

On October 18, 2013, Seabourn announced it had signed a Letter of Intent for the construction of a new cruise ship with Italian shipbuilder Fincantieri. The new ship was  modeled after the line's three newest vessels, Seabourn Odyssey, Seabourn Sojourn and Seabourn Quest. Delivery was completed in 2016. The vessel replaced the capacity that left the Seabourn brand with the sale of Seabourn Pride, Seabourn Spirit and Seabourn Legend. In July 2018, the cruise line announced it would add two expedition ships to its fleet. Seabourn Venture was delivered on June 29, 2022 and inaugural voyage on July 27, 2022. Seabourn Pursuit is scheduled for delivery in February 2023. 

On March 16, 2023 Seabourn announced that Seabourn Odyssey would be sold to Mitsui O.S.K. Lines, Ltd. (MOL). The ship will remain with the brand under a charter agreement through the end of August 2024.

Fleet
The company's fleet currently consists of five vessels, with two sets of sister ships.

Current fleet

Future fleet

Former fleet

See also
 Oceania Cruises
 Regent Seven Seas Cruises
 Silversea Cruises

References

External links

 
1986 establishments in Norway
Carnival Corporation & plc
Companies based in Seattle
Cruise lines
Transport companies established in 1986